Pesadelo na Cozinha is a Brazilian reality television show broadcast on Band network based on the British reality Ramsay's Kitchen Nightmares.

The TV show, commanded by French-Brazilian chef Érick Jacquin, has the objective to help restaurants which are going bankrupt. On 27 July 2017, a second season was confirmed to premiere in 2018, which was later delayed to 2019. In October 2019, a third season was confirmed to 2020. After the COVID-19 pandemic in Brazil, the production was suspended for undetermined time, but Band confirmed that the first 4 episodes would be released on 30 March 2021.

Series overview

Episodes

Season 1 (2017)

Season 2 (2019)

Season 3 (2021)

Criticism
Before its premiere, the choice of Érick Jacquin to present the TV show was criticized by Danielle Dahoui, chef and presenter of the fourth season of Hell's Kitchen: Cozinha sob Pressão. In an interview to UOL, she criticized Jacquin's attitude and what he represents: "But how does a person [...] who has millions of labour lawsuits, will present a show like this?"

Writing to Observatório da Televisão, Endrigo Annyston said that the "main problem of Pesadelo na Cozinha is being fake in excess [...] it doesn't show the truth. If the TV shows Casos de Família and João Kléber Show raise doubts about the veracity of the cases presented, the reality show appears to be extremely rehearsed. [...] This is common in televisive attractions, not everything is improvised. The problem is to make the acting so obvious."

Awards

See also
 Ramsay's Kitchen Nightmares, British version presented by Gordon Ramsay
 Kitchen Nightmares, American version also presented by Gordon Ramsay

References

External links
 

Rede Bandeirantes original programming
2017 in Brazilian television
2017 Brazilian television series debuts
Television series by Banijay